State Road 258 is a short undivided two-lane road in Jackson County in the southern part of the U.S. state of Indiana.

Route description
State Road 258 begins at State Road 58 about a mile northeast of the small town of Freetown. State Road 258 runs east from Freetown, while its parent route State Road 58 angles to the northeast on its way to the Columbus area.

Major intersections

History
The Bell Ford Bridge was located next to State Road 258 until it collapsed in 2006.

References

External links

258
Transportation in Jackson County, Indiana